Katun is a steel inverted roller coaster at the Mirabilandia amusement park, Savio, outside Ravenna, Italy. It is the longest inverted roller coaster in Europe.

Ride experience

The track layout bears similarities to Raptor at Cedar Point, but with larger elements. The train departs the station and makes a carousel turn to the left onto the  lift hill. Once the train has crested the top of the lift hill, it banks to the left and drops  into a vertical loop. The train continues on and up into a zero-g roll, then back down into a highly banked speed turn to the right. Coming out of the turn, the train immediately travels through a cobra roll, followed by a large upwards helix to the right, and onto the mid-course brake run. The train then dives off the mid-course brake run and into a corkscrew, which leads into a tunnel. Exiting the tunnel, the train travels through another corkscrew and a low to the ground helix before slowing to a halt on the final brake run.

Ride elements

Vertical loop
Zero G roll
Cobra roll
Two corkscrews after the block brake

Theme
Katun has an ancient Mayan ruin theme. Riders pass through two circular structures called "Stargates" - one just after leaving the station and another just before entering the final brake run.

A "Katun" is a period of 7200 days (just under 20 years) in the Maya calendar.

Accident and incidents
On August 18, 2007, a 28-year-old man from Morocco was killed after he was struck in the head by the leg of a passenger on the ride. The man had passed a restricted area fence taller than 2 meters, where he wanted to retrieve his hat, lost moments before during a ride on the roller coaster. He didn't realize the coming of the train when he was struck at around 64 mph. The girl whose leg struck the man was injured and the ride was shut down for 24 hours. An investigation ensued, concluding that Mirabilandia's direction was not considered guilty.

Awards

References

External links

 

Roller coasters in Italy
Roller coasters introduced in 2000
Inverted roller coasters manufactured by Bolliger & Mabillard